The Ghana Military Academy is the military academy of the Ghana Armed Forces. It offers basic military training to officer cadets from the Ghana Army, Ghana Navy and the Ghana Air Force. The academy is based in Teshie in the Greater Accra Region.

Entrance to the academy is by examination, and the curriculum includes military and general subjects. Duration of the course for army cadets is two years. At the end of the first six months, a few candidates may be selected to finish their studies at foreign institutions such as the Royal Military Academy at Sandhurst in Britain. The Ghana Military Academy, established in 1960, also provides short courses in higher military education for the officers of the three services. The best senior officers are selected periodically to attend the Army Staff College at Camberley in Britain or one of several other senior service schools in foreign countries.

References

Educational institutions established in 1960
Military academies of Ghana